Nicholas Robert Jennings  is a British computer scientist and the current Vice-Chancellor and President of Loughborough University. He was previously the Vice-Provost for Research and Enterprise at Imperial College London, the UK's first Regius Professor of Computer Science, and the inaugural Chief Scientific Adviser to the UK Government on National Security. His research covers the areas of AI, autonomous systems, agent-based computing and cybersecurity. He is involved in a number of startups including Aerogility, Contact Engine, Crossword Cyber Security, and Reliance Cyber Science. He is also an adviser to Darktrace, a member of the UK Government's AI Council, chair of the National Engineering Policy Centre and a council member for the Engineering and Physical Sciences Research Council.

Education and early life
Jennings was born in London. He grew up on the Isle of Portland in Dorset and attended Weymouth Grammar School.  He studied for an undergraduate degree in computer science at the University of Exeter and his PhD was from the Department of Electronic Engineering at Queen Mary, University of London.

Research and career
His research is on developing AI systems for large-scale, open and dynamic environments. In particular, he focuses on endowing individual autonomous agents with the ability to act and interact in flexible ways and with building systems that contain both humans and software agents.  He has been involved with deployments of systems in domains such as business process management, smart energy systems, sensor networks, disaster response, telecommunications, citizen science and eDefence—and generally advocating the area of agent-oriented software engineering.  His most recent project, ORCHID, developed the science of Human-Agent Collectives (HACs) in which humans and software agents collaborate in seamless partnerships.

In undertaking this research, he has attracted grant income of £33M, published more than 700 articles (with over 400 co-authors) and graduated over 50 PhD students (including two winners and one runner-up of the British Computer Society (BCS)/CPHC Distinguished Dissertation Award.) He has over 90,000 citations in Google Scholar  and an h-index of 130.

From 1988 he was at Queen Mary, University of London, where he was a PhD student, lecturer, reader and professor.

In 1999, he moved to the Department of Electronics and Computer Science at the University of Southampton where he was the Deputy Head of Department, the Associate Dean (Research and Enterprise) for the Faculty of Engineering, Science and Maths, the Head of the Agents, Interaction and Complexity group and the Head of Department. He was appointed the UK's first Regius Professor of Computer Science in 2014.

From 2010 to 2015, he was the UK Government's first Chief Scientific Advisor for National Security.

In 2016, he moved to Imperial College to be the Vice-Provost (Research and Enterprise), as well as a Professor of Artificial Intelligence.

In 2021, he was appointed as the 9th Vice-Chancellor and President of Loughborough University.

Awards 
Jennings was appointed Companion of the Order of the Bath (CB) in the 2016 New Year Honours for services to computer science and national security science.

 
 
 
 
 
 
2007: Int. Foundation for Autonomous Agents and Multi-Agent Systems Special Recognition Award for “Intelligent agents: theory and practice” in The Knowledge Engineering Review
 
 
 
 
 
 
2016: IJCAI-JAIR Best Paper Prize (Honourable Mention) for “Theoretical and practical foundations of large-scale agent-based micro-storage in the smart grid” in Journal of AI Research
2016: The Engineer’s “Collaborate to Innovate” Award for the ORCHID project
2018: Int. Foundation for Autonomous Agents and Multi-Agent Systems Influential Paper Award for “Developing multiagent systems: the Gaia methodology” in ACM Trans. on Software Engineering and Methodology
2020: BCS Lovelace Medal

Fellowships 

 
 
 
 
 
 
 
 
 
2019: Fellow City and Guilds of London Institute
2020: Honorary Fellow of the Cybernetics Society
2022: Fellow of the Royal Society

Personal life 
Jennings is married to Jo and they have two children. He is a keen sportsman—playing cricket for Bishops Waltham  and managing a Waltham Wolves football team for 10 years

References 

1966 births
Living people
Scientists from London
Alumni of the University of Exeter
Alumni of Queen Mary University of London
Academics of the University of Southampton
Companions of the Order of the Bath
Fellows of the Royal Society
Fellows of the Royal Academy of Engineering
Fellows of the British Computer Society
Fellows of the Institution of Engineering and Technology
Fellow Members of the IEEE
Fellows of the Association for the Advancement of Artificial Intelligence
Fellows of the SSAISB
Members of Academia Europaea
Academics of the Department of Computing, Imperial College London
Artificial intelligence researchers
English computer scientists
British computer scientists
People from the Isle of Portland
Vice-Chancellors of Loughborough University